Gillivan is an unincorporated community in Jefferson Township, Madison County, Ohio, United States.

The community was never actually laid out, but simply formed around a crossroads.  As of 1915, the community contained one general store, one hardware store, one blacksmith, and only six houses.

References 

Unincorporated communities in Madison County, Ohio
Unincorporated communities in Ohio